Srbijašume is a Serbian national forestry company based in Belgrade, Serbia. As of 2018, Serbia has a total of 978,283 hectares of land under forests owned by agricultural farms.

See also
 Agriculture in Serbia

References

External links
 

Serbian companies established in 1991
Companies based in Belgrade
Renewable resource companies established in 1991
D.o.o. companies in Serbia
Government-owned companies of Serbia